Ormur,(Urdu: ارمڑ), also spelled Urmar, is a neighborhood on the outskirts of Peshawar in Khyber Pakhtunkhwa, Pakistan. It comprises three similarly named villages: Ormur Bala, Ormur Miana, and Ormur Ormur Payan.

Urmar Payan “URMAR PAYAN” also spelled Ormur Payan (Urdu: ارمڑ پایان), is one of three village located among Ali Biag, Jalozai, Urmar Bala, Wazir Garhi. Urmar Payan is linked through road Pabbi Station and Taru Jabba. there are two Government high schools for Boys and girls, and six primary schools for Boys and girls. Urmar Payan has fertile land and huge amount of plums found here. Population strength about thirty to forty thousand.

Overview and History 
Agriculture is the main source of income and the agriculture land of Ormur is very fertile. All 3 villages, Ormur Payan, Ormur Miana and Ormur Bala have farms of orchards of plum, pear and peach.

Ormur area was established in 1310
 after the migration of Ormurs from their native Waziristan and Logar to Peshawar. The area was part of Nowshera District during the British Raj era, but now form part of Peshawar District.

Administration 
Ormur is part of Pakistan National Assembly seat NA-28 (Peshawar-4) while for KP Provincial Assembly it is part of PK-70.

Population 
According to 2017 census, the population of Ormur Bala was 36,460, Ormur Miana was 33,848, and Ormur Payan was 29,548.

According to 1998 census, the population of Ormur Bala was 24,007, Ormur Miana was 18,992, and Ormur Payan was 19,261.

See also 
 Peshawar District
 Nowshera District

References 

Peshawar District
Populated places in Peshawar District